Joseph Ignatius Murray (born 6 May 1967) is a Guyanese former professional boxer who competed from 1987 to 2000, holding the WBC FECARBOX super-featherweight title in 1993.

He was a protégé of legendary Guyanese trainer Maurice ‘Bizzy’ Boyce.

Professional career
Murray made his professional debut on 18 October 1987, defeating Keith Anthony by first-round knockout (KO) in his hometown of Georgetown, Guyana. After winning 10 of his first 11 fights he defeated Lalta Narine for the vacant national featherweight title on 26 December 1990, retaining once against former Olympian Michael Anthony. From there he moved up two weight classes to capture the vacant national lightweight title in 1991 by beating Winston Goodridge, the man who had handed him his first defeat three years prior.

On 18 April 1993, he defeated Jacobin Yoma by unanimous decision in Georgetown for the vacant WBC FECARBOX super-featherweight title, considered to be the best performance of his 13-year career and one of the best bouts to have ever taken place on Guyanese soil. After two more victories, he faced Anatoly Alexandrov in Russia for the WBC International super-featherweight title, but was knocked out in the second round. He lost four of his next five fights, including a third-round technical knockout (TKO) at the hands of future world champ Shane Mosley, before hanging up his gloves in 2000 with a record of 19–6.

After his retirement, he became a boxing trainer in his homeland, working with a number of young prospects.

Professional boxing record

References

External links
 

Living people
1967 births
Guyanese male boxers
Featherweight boxers
Super-featherweight boxers
Lightweight boxers
Sportspeople from Georgetown, Guyana
Guyanese sports coaches